{| class="infobox" style="width: 25em; text-align: left; font-size: 90%; vertical-align: middle;"
|+ <span style="font-size: 9pt">Accolades received by Blue Velvet</span>
|-
| colspan="3" style="text-align:center;" |
Lynch and Rossellini at the Cannes Film Festival
|-
| colspan=3 |

|- style="background:#d9e8ff;"
| style="text-align:center;" colspan="3"|Total number of wins and nominations'|-
|
|
|
|-
|- style="background:#d9e8ff;"
| colspan="3" style="font-size: smaller; text-align:center;" | Footnotes
|}Blue Velvet is a 1986 American mystery film written and directed by David Lynch. The movie exhibits elements of both film noir and surrealism. The film features Kyle MacLachlan, Isabella Rossellini, Dennis Hopper, and Laura Dern. The title is taken from the 1963 Bobby Vinton song of the same name, which is featured in the film. Although initially detested by some mainstream critics, the film has now become widely acclaimed.Blue Velvet was a critical success for Rossellini and Hopper, earning both several awards for their roles—Hopper's portrayal of the film's antagonist Frank Booth earned him six nominations with four wins, and Rossellini was successful in her Independent Spirit Awards nomination for Best Female Lead—while the film also earned Lynch his second Academy Award nomination for Best Director. As an example of a director casting against the norm, Blue Velvet'' is also noted for re-launching Hopper's career and for providing Rossellini with a dramatic outlet beyond the work as a fashion model and a cosmetics spokeswoman for which she had until then been known.

The film centers on college student Jeffrey Beaumont (MacLachlan), who, returning from a hospital visit to his ill father, discovers a human ear in a field in his hometown of Lumberton. He proceeds to investigate the ear with help from a high school student, Sandy Williams (Dern), who provides him with information and leads from her father, a local police detective. Jeffrey's investigation draws him deeper into his hometown's seedy underworld, and sees him forming a sexual relationship with the alluring torch singer, Dorothy Vallens (Rossellini), and uncovering psychotic criminal Frank Booth (Hopper), who engages in drug abuse, kidnapping, and sexual violence.

Awards and nominations

The film is recognized by the American Film Institute in the following lists:
AFI's 100 Years...100 Thrills – #96
AFI's 10 Top 10 – #8 Mystery Film
AFI's 100 Years...100 Heroes & Villains: Frank Booth – #36 villain

See also
List of accolades received by David Lynch

Footnotes

References

External links
 

Awards Blue Velvet
Blue Velvet